Seosaeng Station is a railway station of the Donghae Line in Seosaeng-myeon Ulju County, Ulsan, South Korea.

External links

Ulju County
Korail stations
Railway stations in Ulsan
Railway stations opened in 1957